Chasma Boreale is a large canyon in Mars's north polar ice cap in the Mare Boreum quadrangle of Mars at 83° north latitude and 47.1° west longitude. The canyon's sides reveal layered features within the ice cap that result from seasonal melting and deposition of ice, together with dust deposits from Martian dust storms. Information about the past climate of Mars may eventually be revealed in these layers, just as tree ring patterns and ice core data do on Earth. Both polar caps also display grooved features, probably caused by wind flow patterns. The grooves are also influenced by the amount of dust. The more dust, the darker the surface. The darker the surface, the more melting as dark surfaces absorb more energy.

Gallery

References

External links

Mare Boreum quadrangle
Valleys and canyons on Mars